The Chiba International Cross Country is an annual cross country running competition which takes place in Chiba, Japan in mid-February. It is one of the IAAF permit meetings which serve as qualifying events for the IAAF World Cross Country Championships.

Initiated in 1966, the Chiba Cross Country is held in Showa-No-Mori Park and features a competition schedule of eight races. These include a senior men's long course (12 km), a senior women's course (6 km), and a senior men's short course (4 km). Furthermore, there are three races for junior athletes which are of shorter distances, as well as two 3 km races for high school runners.

Four of the races act as qualifiers for the World Cross Country Championship: the men's 12 km and the women's 6 km allow athletes to enter the senior world competition while the junior men's 8 km and junior women's 5 km enable runners to qualify for the junior section of the championships. The competition is one of three in which Japanese athletes can qualify for the World Championships; the others being the annual Fukuoka International Cross Country and the biennial Asian Cross Country Championships.

Over a thousand runners compete at the meeting each year, although the attendance record set in 1991 featured nearly twice as many participants. A select number of international athletes are invited to compete each year, although the majority of the field typically comprise a mix of Japanese runners and Japan-based Kenyan athletes. Previous winners include Olympic gold medallists Samuel Wanjiru and Derartu Tulu, eight-time European cross country champion Serhiy Lebid, and Tegla Loroupe – twice winner of the New York City Marathon.

The competition is televised on the NHK BS-1 channel by the Japan Broadcasting Corporation, the country's public broadcaster. After the International Chiba Ekiden, the Chiba International Cross Country is the prefecture's premier athletics event.

The Chiba International Cross Country has also hosted the Asian Cross Country Championship race on two occasions (1995, 1997).

Past senior race winners

Note: Race data unavailable prior to 1987.
Key:    (All other men's races 12 km and women's races 6 km)

References
General
Chiba International Crosscountry. Association of Road Racing Statisticians (2009-02-15). Retrieved on 2010-02-12.

Specific

External links
Japanese Athletics Association website
Showa-no-mori park website 

Cross country running competitions
Athletics competitions in Japan
Recurring sporting events established in 1966
Sport in Chiba (city)
Cross country running in Japan
Winter events in Japan